Unicode is a computing industry standard for the handling of fonts and symbols. Within it is a set of images depicting playing cards, and another depicting the French card suits.

Card suits

The Miscellaneous Symbols block contains the following, at U+2660–2667:

Playing cards deck
Unicode has code points for the 52 cards of the standard French deck plus the Knight (Ace, 2-10, Jack, Knight, Queen, and King for each suit), two for black and white (or red) jokers and a back of a card, in block Playing Cards (U+1F0A0–1F0FF). Also, a specific red joker and twenty-two generic trump cards are added.

Tarot
Four Knights of the Tarot deck are in block Playing Cards (U+1F0A0–1F0FF). Unicode 7.0 added a specific red joker and twenty-two generic trump cards[block?] with the reference description being not the Italian-suited Tarot de Marseille or its derivatives (which are often used in cartomancy) but the French Tarot Nouveau used to play Jeu de tarot.

Playing Cards block chart

Emoji
The Playing Cards block contains one emoji:
.

The emoji presentation sequences refine and colorize the text presentation of the playing card suits. ♠︎♥︎♦︎♣︎ becomes ♠️♥️♦️♣️. This was done by appending the U+FE0F code point to the textual code points shown far above. For example, the black heart suit &#x2665; becomes the red heart emoji by &#x2665;&#xFE0F;. Conversely, the black heart suit can be coerced by appending U+FE0E with &#x2665;&#xFE0E;. These hold for each suit.

There is an emoji for Japanese hanafuda (flower playing cards): . The emoji can stand for any hanafuda card but it is usually depicted as the Moon card specifically.

References

Playing cards
Unicode blocks with characters for games